The 2016 Sparkassen Open is a professional tennis tournament played on clay courts. It is the 23rd edition of the tournament which is part of the 2016 ATP Challenger Tour. It will take place in Braunschweig, Germany between 4 and 10 July 2016.

Singles main-draw entrants

Seeds

 1 Rankings are as of June 27, 2016.

Other entrants
The following players received wildcards into the singles main draw:
  Matthias Bachinger
  Andreas Beck
  Daniel Masur
  Jan-Lennard Struff

The following players received entry as alternates:
  Kenny de Schepper
  Michal Konečný
  Marek Michalička

The following players received entry from the qualifying draw:
  Juan Ignacio Galarza
  Gianluca Mager
  Ante Pavić
  Cedrik-Marcel Stebe

The following player received entry as a lucky loser:
  Norbert Gombos

Doubles main-draw entrants

Seeds

1 Rankings as of June 27, 2016.

Other entrants
The following pairs received wildcards into the doubles main draw:
  Andreas Beck /  Andreas Mies
  Kenny de Schepper /  Axel Michon
  Juan Ignacio Galarza /  Leonardo Mayer

The following pairs received entries courtesy of protected rankings into the doubles main draw:
  Matthias Bachinger /  Frank Moser
  Rameez Junaid /  Simon Stadler

Champions

Singles

  Thomaz Bellucci def.  Íñigo Cervantes, 6–1, 1–6, 6–3

Doubles

  James Cerretani /  Philipp Oswald def.  Mateusz Kowalczyk /  Antonio Šančić, 4–6, 7–6(7–5), [10–2]

External links
Official Website

Sparkassen Open
Sparkassen Open
2016 in German tennis